In Greek and Roman mythology, Iapyx (from Greek Ἰάπυξ, gen.: Ἰάπυγος), Iapux or Iapis was a favorite of Apollo. The god wanted to confer upon him the gift of prophecy, the lyre, etc.; but Iapyx, wishing to prolong the life of his father, preferred the more tranquil art of healing to all the others.

Virgil's Aeneid (XII: 391–402) relates that Iapyx was Aeneas's healer during the Trojan War and then escaped to Italy after the war, founding Apulia.

Family 
His descent is unclear. He was either:
a son of Iasus, or
the son of Lycaon, which would make him the brother of Daunius and Peucetius (who went as leaders of a colony to Italy), or
a Cretan, from whom the Cretans who migrated to Italy derived the name of Iapyges, or
 a son of Daedalus either:
 by his wife, thus making him a full-brother of Icarus;
 by another Cretan woman.

Other use 
Iapyx is also the name of a minor Greek wind god, the north-west or west-north-west wind. Virgil relates this Iapyx to the wind that carried the fleeing Cleopatra home to Egypt after her loss at the battle of Actium.

Notes

References 

 Antoninus Liberalis, The Metamorphoses of Antoninus Liberalis translated by Francis Celoria (Routledge 1992). Online version at the Topos Text Project.
 Herodotus, The Histories with an English translation by A. D. Godley. Cambridge. Harvard University Press. 1920. . Online version at the Topos Text Project. Greek text available at Perseus Digital Library.
 Publius Vergilius Maro, Aeneid. Theodore C. Williams. trans. Boston. Houghton Mifflin Co. 1910. Online version at the Perseus Digital Library.
 Publius Vergilius Maro, Bucolics, Aeneid, and Georgics. J. B. Greenough. Boston. Ginn & Co. 1900. Latin text available at the Perseus Digital Library.
 Strabo, The Geography of Strabo. Edition by H.L. Jones. Cambridge, Mass.: Harvard University Press; London: William Heinemann, Ltd. 1924. Online version at the Perseus Digital Library.
 Strabo, Geographica edited by A. Meineke. Leipzig: Teubner. 1877. Greek text available at the Perseus Digital Library.

Mythological Greek physicians
People of the Trojan War
Cretan characters in Greek mythology
Male lovers of Apollo
LGBT themes in Greek mythology